The 2022 World Judo Cadets Championships will be held at the Arena Hotel Hills in Sarajevo, Bosnia and Herzegovina, from 24 to 28 August 2022, with the mixed teams event taking place on the competition's last day.

Schedule
All times are local (UTC+2).

Medal summary
India won its first ever gold medal at a Judo World Championships.

Medal table

Men's events

Women's events

Mixed

Prize money
The sums written are per medalist, bringing the total prizes awarded to 80,000€ for the individual contests and 20,000€ for the team competition.

References

External links
 

World Judo Cadets Championships
 U18
World U18
Judo
Judo competitions in Bosnia and Herzegovina
Judo
Judo